Dub is a market town in Prachatice District in the South Bohemian Region of the Czech Republic. It has about 400 inhabitants.

Administrative parts
Villages and hamlets of Borčice, Dubská Lhota, Dvorec and Javornice are administrative parts of Dub.

Notable people
Václav Vondrák (1859–1925), slavist and philologist

References

Populated places in Prachatice District
Market towns in the Czech Republic